The Sons of the San Joaquin is an American Western family band. Jack and Joe Hannah are brothers, while third member Lon Hannah is Joe's son.  They began performing together in 1987 at a birthday party for Lon's grandfather. They have been credited with "rich durability of the traditional Western music they present, as well as the outstanding original cowboy songs"  and being reminiscent of the Sons of the Pioneers. Roy Rogers called them "the only singing group alive who I feel sound like the original Sons of the Pioneers." They have over a dozen albums, including a gospel album and a greatest hits album.

They were inducted into the Western Music Association Hall of Fame in 2006.  Several of their albums have been given awards by the National Cowboy and Western Heritage Museum (Cowboy Hall of Fame).

Personnel
Jack Hannah – Vocals, Rhythm & Lead Guitar. Jack Hannah is the younger brother of Joe Hannah and the paternal uncle of Lon Hannah. Jack pitched for the Milwaukee Braves farm system and then became a high school counselor and coach (he was named Baseball Coach of the Year for the Western Region United States in 1980.) He was inducted into the Fresno Athletic Hall of Fame in 1998. A professional songwriter, Jack shared in the Sons of the San Joaquin Round Up Newsletter (vol 9, no 1, 2005) that he struggled through grade and high school and if he had been "born today" would have been diagnosed with ADD.  "I wrote songs. I have written scores of songs that will never see the light of day because I write them for no other purpose than that they are just there, a consequence of reading."  Stressing the importance of reading the Young at Heart CD, was written with the purpose of creating in the minds of children a passion for learning, and a desire to read.  "I start the day reading the Book of Books, the Bible.  I am not trying to sound pious.  I'm telling you this is to underscore how important reading special books is to me.  To try to understand the Divine and to grasp the lessons of history are my passions and most of my songs flow from these sources."  Jack has written for a critically acclaimed children's series "Red, Rite & Recite which is a series of books, CD's and videos that feature Dusty Trails (Dr. Gary Sells.) Jack has repeated won Songwriter of the Year awards from the Western Music Association and was the recipient of the Wrangler Award from the National Cowboy Hall of Fame.
Joe Hannah – Vocals & Bass. According to the Sons of the San Joaquin Round Up Newsletter (vol 1, no 3, 1997), in high school, Joe was courted by the Yankees and Dodgers and received major college scholarship offers from USC, UCLA and other schools.  In 1950, he signed with the Cubs and started playing for their class A Visalia, California team.  When the season was over, he went to the Los Angeles Angels.  In 1952, his career was interrupted when he was drafted into the army. Upon return in 1958, his contract was bought by the Toronto Maple Leafs baseball club.  He spent 13 seasons in minor league baseball with a hitting life-time average of .275 before retiring.  Joe became a high school teacher, coach and music director. His solo song "Wyoming on my Mind" was especially written for him by recording artist Charlie Daniels.
Lon Hannah – Vocals, Lead & Rhythm Guitar. According to the Sons of the San Joaquin Round Up Newsletter (vol 7, no 2, 2003), Lonnie Joe Hannah was born in Pasadena, California while his father Joe Hannah was playing ball on the opening night of the Pacific Coast League on April 10, 1956. His father Joe hit a double, his team won and his wife Kay (B: 3-22-1932 D: 4-3-2004) gave birth to Lonnie Joe.  Lon became an elementary school teacher and was the originator of the family coming together to sing the cowboy songs so loved by many.

Discography

Great American Cowboy (1990)
Bound for the Rio Grande (1991)
A Cowboy Has to Sing (1992)
Songs of the Silver Screen (1993)
From Whence Came the Cowboy (1995)
Gospel Trails (1997)
Christmas (1998)
Horses, Cattle and Coyotes (1999)
Sing One for the Cowboy (2000)
15 Years: A Retrospective (2002)
For the Young, and the Young at Heart (2005)
Way Out Yonder (2005)
A Cowboy's Song (2011)
One More Ride (2017)

Solo discography

Songs of Faith - Jack Hannah
'Cause I Always Wanted To - Lon Hannah (2006)

References

External links
 The Sons — Official home page
 Band profile

Country music groups from Tennessee
Culture of the Western United States